The German mathematician Peter Gustav Lejeune Dirichlet (1805–1859) is the eponym of many things.

Mathematics 
 Theorems named Dirichlet's theorem:
Dirichlet's approximation theorem (diophantine approximation)
Dirichlet's theorem on arithmetic progressions (number theory, specifically prime numbers)
Dirichlet's unit theorem (algebraic number theory and rings)
 Dirichlet algebra
 Dirichlet beta function
 Dirichlet boundary condition (differential equations)
Neumann–Dirichlet method
 Dirichlet characters (number theory, specifically zeta and L-functions. 1831)
 Dirichlet conditions (Fourier series)
 Dirichlet convolution (number theory and arithmetic functions)
 Dirichlet density (number theory)
Dirichlet average
 Dirichlet distribution (probability theory)
Dirichlet-multinomial distribution
 Dirichlet negative multinomial distribution
Generalized Dirichlet distribution (probability theory)
Grouped Dirichlet distribution
Inverted Dirichlet distribution
Matrix variate Dirichlet distribution
 Dirichlet divisor problem (currently unsolved) (Number theory)
 Dirichlet eigenvalue
 Dirichlet's ellipsoidal problem
 Dirichlet eta function (number theory)
 Dirichlet form
 Dirichlet function (topology)
 Dirichlet hyperbola method
 Dirichlet integral
 Dirichlet kernel (functional analysis, Fourier series)
Dirichlet L-function
 Dirichlet principle
 Dirichlet problem (partial differential equations)
 Dirichlet process
Dependent Dirichlet process
Hierarchical Dirichlet process
 Imprecise Dirichlet process
 Dirichlet ring (number theory)
 Dirichlet series (analytic number theory)
Dirichlet series inversion
General Dirichlet series
 Dirichlet space 
 Dirichlet stability criterion (dynamical systems)
 Dirichlet tessellation, Dirichlet cell, Dirichlet polygon also called a Voronoi diagram (geometry)
 Dirichlet's test (analysis)
 Dirichlet's energy
 Pigeonhole principle/Dirichlet's box (or drawer) principle (combinatorics)
 Latent Dirichlet allocation
 Class number formula

Physics 
 Dirichlet membrane

Non-mathematical 
11665 Dirichlet
Dirichlet (crater)
Dirichlet–Jackson Basin

Dirichlet